The TACAM R-1 (Tun Anticar pe Afet Mobil R-1 – "Anti-tank gun on R-1 mobile gun carriage") was a small tank destroyer for use by Romania during World War II. It was designed on 22 November 1943 at the request of the Romanian General Staff. Fourteen R-1 vehicles were to be rearmed with 45 mm 20-K guns. Although this vehicle was designed to be used only for security duties, the project was cancelled because it was eventually regarded as a waste of badly needed industrial capacity, the 45 mm gun having been obsolete against most Soviet tanks by then.

See also 
 R-1 tank
 other TACAM tank destroyers

Notes

References 

 Mark Axworthy, Cornel Scafeș, Cristian Crăciunoiu,Third Axis. Fourth Ally. Romanian Armed Forces in the European War, 1941-1945, Arms and Armour, London, 1995. 

Tank destroyers of Romania
World War II tank destroyers
World War II armoured fighting vehicles of Romania